Valerie Maurice Ebe  (née Bassey, born 26 March 1947), is a Nigerian lawyer and politician who was the first female Deputy Governor of Akwa Ibom State.

Early life and education
Ebe was born on the 26 March 1947 to Edidem Paul Bassey, the provincial ruler of Etoi Clan. She attended the Holy Child Primary School, Calabar and was admitted into Holy Child Secondary School, Calabar in 1957 for her secondary school education. She later trained to be a teacher at the Holy Child Teacher Training College, Ifuho. She studied History and Archaeology at the University of Nigeria, Nsukka and later studied law at the University of Uyo. She was admitted as a Barrister and Solicitor of the Supreme Court of Nigeria in 1998.

References

Living people
1947 births
Women state deputy governors of Nigeria
Akwa Ibom State politicians
Peoples Democratic Party (Nigeria) politicians
University of Nigeria alumni
Nigerian women lawyers
University of Uyo alumni